The kukumai (Bathybagrus grandis) is a species of claroteid catfish endemic to Lake Tanganyika along the border of Burundi, the Democratic Republic of the Congo, Tanzania, and Zambia.  It reaches a length of 63 cm (24.8 inches) TL and is a minor component of local commercial fisheries.

References

 

Claroteidae
Fish of Lake Tanganyika
Fish described in 1917
Taxonomy articles created by Polbot
Taxobox binomials not recognized by IUCN